Uroš Sekulić (born 10 February 1998) is a Serbian footballer who plays for Proleter Novi Sad.

Career
On 8 August 2019, Sekulić joined NK Triglav Kranj. One month later, he was loaned out to NK Bled for the rest of 2019.

Career statistics

References

External links
 
 
 

1998 births
Living people
Association football defenders
Serbian footballers
Serbian expatriate footballers
FK Borac Čačak players
FK Polet Ljubić players
NK Triglav Kranj players
FK Rad players
FK Inđija players
FK Proleter Novi Sad players
Serbian SuperLiga players
Serbian First League players
Serbian expatriate sportspeople in Slovenia
Expatriate footballers in Slovenia